This is a list of the songs that reached number-one position in official Polish single chart in ZPAV in 2020.

Chart history

Number-one artists

See also 
 Polish music charts
 List of number-one albums of 2020 (Poland)

References 

Poland
2020
No On